Quentin Durward is a historical novel by Sir Walter Scott, first published in 1823.  The story concerns a Scottish archer in the service of the French King Louis XI (1423–1483) who plays a prominent part in the narrative.

Composition and sources
Quentin Durward was composed in a remarkably short space of time. After carrying out some preparatory research towards the end of 1822 Scott began writing in January 1823 and supplied the finishing sentences in response to a request from his coadjutor James Ballantyne on 3 May.

Scott's principal source was the Mémoires of Philippe de Commines. As usual he adapts historical facts freely in the construction of his fiction, though he generally follows Comines' balanced approach to the character of Louis XI. He was able to make substantial use of other documents and the editorial commentary in the collection in which Comines was included, the first series of the Collection complete des mémoires relatifs a l'histoire de France by [Claude Bernard] Petitot (1819‒26). Occasional details are drawn from a wide range of historians, most of whom were more hostile to Louis. It is likely that some details for Scott's descriptions of northern France were derived from manuscript material deriving from continental journeys by his friend James Skene of Rubislaw. For his gipsy material Scott relied largely on two works: 'Dissertation on the Gipseys ... from the German of H. M. G. Grellmann (1807), and A Historical Survey of the Customs, Habits, and Present State of the Gypsies by John Hoyland (1816).

Editions
The first edition was published in three volumes in London on 17 May 1823 by Hurst, Robinson, and Co., and in Edinburgh two days later by Archibald Constable and Co. As with all the Waverley novels before 1827 publication was anonymous. The print run was 10,000 and the price one and a half guineas (£1 11s 6d or £1.57½). In 1830 Scott provided Quentin Durward with an introduction and notes for the 'Magnum' edition, where it appeared in two volumes in December 1831 and January 1832. 

The standard modern edition, by J. H. Alexander and G. A. M. Wood, was published as Volume 15 of the Edinburgh Edition of the Waverley Novels in 2001: this is based on the first edition; the 'Magnum' material appears in Volume 25b.

Plot introduction 
The plot centres on the medieval rivalry between Louis XI of France and Charles the Bold, Duke of Burgundy. Louis incites the citizens of Liège to revolt against Charles, and they seize and murder Charles's brother-in-law, Louis de Bourbon, Bishop of Liège, under the command of Louis's ally, William de la Marck, who was hoping to install his son in Louis de Bourbon's place (a real historical event which occurred in 1482).

At the time of the murder, Louis is present in Charles' camp at Péronne, hoping to fool him with a false display of friendship. Charles, however, sees through his mask of deceit, accuses him of instigating the uprising, and has him imprisoned. Louis's superior coolness of mind permits him to allay Charles's suspicions and to regain his liberty. In a sub-plot, the Burgundian heiress Isabelle de Croye takes refuge at Louis's court when Charles attempts to give her hand in marriage to his odious favourite Campo-Basso. Louis, in turn, resolves to give her in marriage to the bandit-captain William de la Marck, and sends her to Flanders under the pretence of placing her under the protection of the Bishop of Liège. She is guarded on her journey by Quentin Durward, an archer, who has left behind poverty in Scotland to join the Archers of Louis's Scottish Guard. Quentin prevents the intended treachery and earns Isabelle's love. Charles, though, promises her in marriage to the Duke of Orléans (heir to the French crown) but she refuses, and, in anger, the Duke promises her to whoever brings him the head of de la Marck. This Quentin does with the help of his uncle, Ludovic Lesley, and wins Isabelle's hand.

Plot summary 
The story takes place in the year 1468. The age of feudalism and chivalry was passing away, and the King of France was inciting the wealthy citizens of Flanders against his own rebellious vassal the Duke of Burgundy. Quentin Durward had come to Tours, where his uncle was one of the Scottish body guard maintained by Louis XI, to seek military service, and was invited by the king, disguised as a merchant, to breakfast at the inn, and supplied by him with money. Having narrowly escaped being hanged by the provost-marshal for cutting down Zamet, whom he found suspended from a tree, he was enlisted by Lord Crawford, and learned the history of Jacqueline. In the presence-chamber he was recognised by Louis, and the royal party were preparing for a hunting excursion, when the Count of Crèvecœur arrived with a peremptory demand for the instant surrender of the duke's ward, the Countess of Croye, who had fled from Burgundy with her aunt to escape a forced marriage; and proclaimed that his master renounced his allegiance to the crown of France. In the chase which followed Durward saved the king's life from a boar, for which service Louis, after consulting with his barber, entrusted him with the duty of conducting the Countess and Lady Hameline, ostensibly to the protection of the Bishop of Liege, but really that they might fall into the hands of William de la Marck. After proceeding some distance they were overtaken by Dunois and the Duke of Orléans, who would have seized the countess, but were prevented by Lord Crawford, who arrived in pursuit and made prisoners of them. Then Hayraddin came riding after them, and under his guidance they journeyed for nearly a week, when Quentin discovered that the Bohemian was in league with De la Marck. He accordingly altered their route, and they reached the bishop's castle in safety.

A few days afterwards, however, it was assaulted by the citizens, and Hayraddin having effected Lady Hameline's escape with Marthon, Quentin rushed back to save the countess, and, at Gieslaer's suggestion, Pavilion passed them as his daughter and her sweetheart into the great hall where the outlaw, who was known as the Boar of Ardennes, was feasting with the rioters. The bishop, who was also governor of the city, was then dragged in, and, having denounced his captor, was murdered by a stroke of Nikkel Blok's cleaver. There was a shout for vengeance, but De la Marck summoned his soldiers, upon which Quentin held a dirk at the throat of his son Carl, and exhorted the citizens to return to their homes. With the syndic's help Lady Isabella and her protector reached Charleroi, where she was placed in a convent, while he carried the news to the Duke of Burgundy, at whose court Louis, with a small retinue, was a guest. Charles, in a furious rage, accused the king of being privy to the sacrilege, and caused him to be treated as a prisoner.

At a council the following day he was charged with abetting rebellion among the vassals of Burgundy, and the countess was brought as a witness against him. She admitted her fault, and Quentin Durward was being questioned respecting his escort of her, when a herald arrived with a demand from De la Marck to be acknowledged as Prince-Bishop of Liège, and for the release of his ally the King of France. Louis replied that he intended to gibbet the murderer, and the messenger, who was discovered to be Hayraddin, was sentenced to death, the quarrel between the duke and the king being at the same time adjusted, on the understanding that the Duke of Orléans should marry Lady Isabelle. Crèvecœur, however, interceded for her, and it was arranged that whoever should bring the head of the Boar of Ardennes might claim her hand. Quentin, who had learnt his plans from the Bohemian, advanced with the allied troops of France and Burgundy against his stronghold, and a desperate battle ensued. At length the young Scot was in the act of closing with De la Marck, when Pavilion's daughter implored his protection from a French soldier; and, while placing her in safety, his uncle La Balafré fought the ruffian, and carried his head to the royal presence. Lord Crawford declared him to be of gentle birth, but the old soldier having resigned his pretensions to his nephew, King Louis vouched for Quentin's services and prudence, and the duke being satisfied as to his descent, remarked that it only remained to inquire what were the fair lady's sentiments towards the young emigrant in search of honourable adventure, who, by his sense, firmness and gallantry, thus became the fortunate possessor of wealth, rank and beauty.

Characters 

Principal characters in bold

 Quentin Durward, a Scottish cadet
 Ludovic Lesley, Le Balafré ('scarred'), his maternal uncle
 King Louis XI of France, first seen as Maitre Pierre
 Tristan l'Hermite, his provost-marshal
 Petit-André, Tristan's assistant
 Dame Perrette, hostess of 'The Fleur de Lys'
 Isabelle, Countess of Croye, first seen as Dame Perrette's servant Jacqueline
 Lady Hameline, her aunt
 Lord Crawford, commander of Scottish archers
 Count de Dunois, grand huntsman
 Louis, Duke of Orléans, the future Louis XII of France 
 Cardinal Jean Balue
 The Bishop of Auxerre
 Olivier le Dain, the court barber
 Princess Anne of Beaujeau and Princess Joan, the king's daughters
 Philippe de Crèvecœur d'Esquerdes, Count of Burgundy
 The Countess, his wife
 Toison d'Or, his herald
 William de la Marck, the freebooting 'Boar of the Ardennes'
 Carl Eberson, his son
 Hayraddin Maugrabin, a Bohemian
 Zamet, his brother
 Marthon, a gipsy woman
 Louis of Bourbon, Prince-Bishop of Liège
 Pavillon, a currier and syndic
 Gertrude, his daughter
 Peterkin Geislaer, his deputy
 Nikkel Blok, a butcher
 Philippe D'Argenton (Philippe de Commines)
 Lord of Hymbercourt, governor of Liège
 Duke Charles of Burgundy, or Charles the Bold
 Le Glorieux, his jester
 Martius Galeotti, or Martivalle, an astrologer

Chapter summary

Volume One

Introduction:  In the course of an extended residence in France the Author is inspired by the library and family papers in the Chateau de Hautlieu to produce the narration that follows.

Ch. 1 The Contrast: The calculating Louis XI and the impulsive Charles the Bold of Burgundy are set against each other.

Ch. 2 The Wanderer: Quentin Durward, a Scottish archer in search of mercenary employment in France, encounters Maitre Pierre and a companion; after attending a hunting-mass they approach the royal castle of Plessis.

Ch. 3 The Castle: Maitre Pierre conducts Quentin past the castle to an inn.

Ch. 4 The Dejeuner: Maitre Pierre and Quentin discuss the archer's employment over breakfast. Quentin asks the innkeeper about Maitre Pierre's identity, but he is evasive. In his bedroom Quentin hears a young woman nearby singing 'County Guy' to her lute.

Ch. 5 The Man-at-Arms: Quentin and his uncle Ludovic Lesley (Le Balafré), serving in Louis's Scots Guards, catch up with family news. Quentin and Balafré debate whether it is preferable to serve Louis or Charles.

Ch. 6 The Bohemians: Quentin feels disappointed by Balafré's narrow-mindedness. He is threatened with execution by Louis's provost-marshal Tristan l'Hermite (Maitre Pierre's companion) and his assistant Petit-André for cutting down a hanged gypsy, but he is rescued by a detachment of the Guards under Balafré.

Ch. 7 The Enrolment:  Quentin is enlisted into the Guards by their commander Lord Crawford, who says that Isabelle of Croye and her aunt Lady Hameline have arrived to claim Louis's protection after Isabelle's rejection of her guardian Charles's proposal that she marry his favourite Campo-basso.

Ch. 8  The Envoy: At Court Louis, whom Quentin recognises as Maitre Pierre, attempts to mollify the Burgundian envoy Count Crevecœur who has demanded the return of the Croyes.

Ch. 9  The Boar-Hunt: Offended by Louis' behaviour towards himself, the Cardinal La Balue arranges to meet Crevecœur who has come to his assistance after a hunting fall. At the same hunt Quentin rescues Louis from the boar.

Ch. 10  The Sentinel: Louis arranges for Quentin to keep concealed watch as he entertains Crevecœur and Balue to dinner.

Volume Two

Ch. 1 (11)  The Hall of Roland: Restored to open guard duty, Quentin witnesses a meeting between the Croyes and Princess Joan, whose destined husband the Duke of Orleans joins them and torments her by his attentions to Isabelle.

Ch. 2 (12)  The Politician: Louis explains to Oliver le Dain his intention to instruct Quentin to convey the Croyes to Liège so that William de la Marck can seize and marry Isabelle.

Ch. 3 (13)  The Journey: Delighted with his commission, Quentin accompanies Louis to the sage Galeotti, who says the scheme will bring success to the sender but danger to those sent. Galeotti promises to carry out an astronomical calculation relating to Louis' plan to negotiate with Charles in person, but privately determines to inform Balue.

Ch. 4 (14)  The Journey: As their journey begins, Quentin defends the Croyes from two horsemen: their combat is interrupted by the arrival of Crawford.

Ch. 5 (15)  The Guide: Crawford arrests the horsemen, revealed as Orleans and the Count de Dunois, and Isabelle tends Quentin's wound.  Hayraddin arrives to act as guide.

Ch. 6 (16)  The Vagrant: Hayraddin expounds his view of life to Quentin and identifies himself as the brother of the man whose body he had cut down in Ch. 6. He is expelled from monastic accommodation for egregious misbehaviour, arousing Quentin's suspicions.

Ch. 7 (17)  The Espied Spy: Quentin overhears Hayraddin and a Lanzknecht arranging to ambush the Croyes for William, while sparing Quentin's life.

Ch. 8 (18) Palmistry: Quentin obtains the Croyes' permission to change their planned route, and they arrive at Schonwaldt, the Bishop's castle near Liège.

Ch. 9 (19) The City: After Hayraddin reveals he has continued access to the Croyes, Quentin is acclaimed as a Guard by the citizens of Liège and rescued from the embarrassing situation by the syndic (magistrate) Pavillon.

Ch. 10 (20) The Billet: Quentin receives an encouraging note dropped from a window into the castle garden. As Schonwaldt is stormed by the Liégois it becomes clear that Hayraddin has arranged to rescue Hameline, who he thinks is Quentin's intended wife, rather than Isabelle.

Ch. 11 (21) The Sack: Quentin arranges with Pavillon to rescue Isabelle by passing her off as the syndic's daughter.

Ch. 12 (22) The Revellers: During wild revelry William has the Bishop murdered. Quentin takes charge of the situation and leaves with Isabelle for the syndic's house.

Ch. 13 (23) The Flight: Escorted by Quentin, Isabelle sets out to submit to Charles again, surrendering herself to Crevecœur on the road.

Volume Three

Ch. 1 (24) The Surrender: Crevecœur treats Quentin with disdain and they press on to Péronne, leaving Isabelle at Charleroi.

Ch. 2 (25) The Unbidden Guest: After a short pause at Landrecy, Quentin is treated with more respect by Crevecoeur, who on reaching Péronne is informed by D'Hymbercourt and D'Argenton of Louis's arrival to meet Charles.

Ch. 3 (26) The Interview: Louis has an initial exploratory conversation with Charles, takes up his lodgings, and debates with Dain the wisdom of coming to Péronne.

Ch. 4 (27) The Explosion: Louis woos Charles's ministers individually, and when Crevecœur brings Charles news of the Bishop's murder skilfully limits the damage.

Ch. 5 (28) Uncertainty: Louis decides to kill Galeotti, who he believes has betrayed him. Balafré objects to killing in cold blood, but Tristan makes the necessary arrangements.

Ch. 6 (29) Recrimination: Galeotti tricks Louis into sparing his life.

Ch. 7 (30) Uncertainty: Charles consults his counsellors and plans to confront Louis to ascertain his role, if any, in the Bishop's murder. D'Argenton advises Louis how best to treat Charles.

Ch. 8 (31) The Interview:  In an interview with Isabelle arranged by Crawford, Quentin asks her to tell Charles only what she knows about Louis from personal experience, to avoid inflaming the situation.

Ch. 9 (32) The Investigation: First Isabelle, and then Quentin, testify discreetly before Charles in the presence of Louis and Burgundian nobles.

Ch. 10 (33) The Herald: Hayraddin appears as William's herald: he is exposed by Charles's herald, chased by hunting dogs to the entertainment of Charles and Louis, and condemned to death.

Ch. 11 (34) The Execution: Before his execution by Tristran and Petit-André, Hayraddin tells Quentin of William's plan to disguise some of his men as French auxiliaries at Liège.

Ch. 12 (35) A Prize for Honour: Louis and Charles agree that Isabelle will be awarded to the warrior who kills William.

Ch. 13 (36) The Sally: As the Burgundian forces set out for Liège with Louis in attendance, Quentin gives Isabelle a letter from Hameline, passed on by Hayraddin before his execution, defending William whom she has married. Quentin discloses William's tactic to Louis and Charles.

Ch. 14 (37) The Sally: Quentin is diverted from encountering William in battle by the necessity of saving Pavillon's daughter from assault. Balafré kills William and surrenders his prize Isabelle to Quentin.

Reception

The reviews of Quentin Durward were mostly favourable, rating it among the best of the Waverley Novels, though there were a few dissenting voices. Particularly appreciated were the witty Introduction, the contrasting depictions of Louis and Charles, the striking incidents and descriptions, the control of the plot (though some thought it thin), and the vivid presentation of an interesting and unfamiliar period. The most common adverse criticisms were that historical analysis was too prominent, threatening to overpower the fiction, and that the female characters were weak. Sales in Britain were initially rather slow, perhaps because it came too quickly after Peveril of the Peak, but it was an immediate hit on the Continent.

Adaptations 
 1953 comic book adaptation in Thriller Picture Library № 48
 1955 movie The Adventures of Quentin Durward, starring Robert Taylor
 1971 TV series Quentin Durward
 1988 Soviet movie The Adventures of Quentin Durward, The Archer of The King's Guard
 an illustrated novel drawn by the Portuguese artist Fernando Bento and first published in the Fifties in the boy's journal Cavaleiro Andante
 an opera by François-Auguste Gevaert (1858) on a libretto by Eugène Cormon and Michel Carré

References

External links 
 
 Page on Quentin Durward at the Walter Scott Digital Archive
 

1823 British novels
Novels by Walter Scott
Novels set in the 1460s
British novels adapted into films
Durward, Quentin
Novels set in France
Fictional representations of Romani people
British novels adapted into television shows
Cultural depictions of Charles the Bold
Cultural depictions of Louis XI of France
Waverley Novels